Legoland Billund Resort, the original Legoland park, opened on 7 June 1968 in Billund, Denmark. The park is located next to the original Lego factory and Billund Airport, Denmark's second-busiest airport. Over 1.9 million guests visited the park in 2011, and since the opening more than 50 million guests have visited the park. This makes Legoland the largest tourist attraction in Denmark outside Copenhagen. The Legoland parks that have since been built are modelled upon Legoland Billund, most noticeably the Miniland area, which is made up of millions of plastic Lego bricks.

History

The Lego company, led by Ole Kirk Christiansen, introduced plastic toys alongside their existing wooden toy line in 1949 after purchasing one of the first injection moulding machines in 1947. One son, Godtfred Kirk Christiansen (GKC), was named the managing director of the family business in 1957 shortly before his father died and just two years later he bought out his three brothers. In the 1960s, GKC decided to open a  Legoland Park adjacent to the Lego factory in Billund to promote his toy business; the factory itself was already drawing approximately 20,000 visitors per year by the mid-1960s, who came to view models produced for trade shows and shops.  GKC hired Arnold Boutrop as the park's first general director and designer; after visiting Madurodam, the two men began finalizing plans for what would become Miniland, the main attraction of Legoland. Dagny Holm, a cousin of GKC trained as a sculptor who was hired as a model designer in 1961 is credited with much of the original design and building of Miniland. The park became an instant success, with 625,000 visitors in its first abbreviated season after opening on 7 June 1968.

Over the years, Legoland Billund has added many original models and rides. The park, which has now been expanded to cover , is divided into nine themed areas, including Duplo Land, Imagination Zone, LEGOREDO Town, Adventure Land, Lego City, Knight's Kingdom, Mini Land, Pirate Land, and Polar Land.

Today, Legoland Billund is the most visited tourist attraction in Jutland and the third-most visited attraction in Denmark, after Tivoli Gardens and Dyrehavsbakken. Several other Legolands have since been built in other parts of the world:
 Legoland Windsor Resort (1996)
 Legoland California (1999)
 Legoland Deutschland Resort (2002)
 Legoland Florida (2011)
 Legoland Malaysia Resort (2012)
 Legoland Dubai Resort (2016)
 Legoland Japan Resort (2017)

The Blackstone Group, an investment firm, bought a 70% controlling stake in Legoland in 2005, with the remaining 30% still owned by Lego. The parks are operated by Merlin Entertainments.

Themed Lego Lands

, the park has nine themed areas.

Adventure Land
This area contains some of the park's more exciting rides such as the wild mouse roller coaster, X-treme Racers. Jungle Racers jet ski ride has a jungle theme and spins the riders quite fast. In 2010, The Temple was introduced, an indoor ride where riders board Explorer SUVs and are equipped with laser guns to shoot at moving targets in 11 scenes themed to ancient Egypt. The Temple also has a game area with an Egyptian theme, containing ring-toss, water-shooting, balloon-popping and a mummy game. The area contains two gift shops (Temple Gifts and Adventure Shop) and two restaurants.
Falck Fire Brigade is a ride where you take your assigned vehicle to the scene of a fire where you and your fellow firefighters have to put out a fire in a building, and the fastest team wins.

Duplo Land 
Duplo Land contains rides and attractions for young children, with the Lego Duplo brand name. The Duplo Playhouse is a play area for children ages 2–6, which is themed like a city in which children can play. They can build using Lego, or play on planes and cars. There are also slides, stairs, interactive elements and a role-play area. The Duplo Train, a train ride that looks like a train made of Duplo bricks, takes two minutes to complete its loop. Duplo Planes is a plane ride similar to Disney's Dumbo ride, but with a Lego theme. The land also used to feature Duplo Driving School. This was a car ride for children ages 2–6, who are not yet ready for the Traffic School ride.

Imagination Zone
This zone contains the Lego Studios, a purpose-built 600-seat 4-D theater, complete with special effects and a giant screen.

Lego Atlantis by Sea Life was added in 2007. The attraction starts off with an animated movie, featuring Lego figures and a submarine that travels down to the submerged city of Atlantis. There is also a Sea Life aquarium featuring a walk-through underwater tunnel and other hands-on activities with more than 800 sea creatures. Numerous Lego figures and models are in and around the aquarium.

Knight's Kingdom
Knight's Kingdom contains The Dragon coaster, located inside a medieval castle. The ride starts with a slow-moving dark ride scene with Lego figures themed to medieval times, including a mighty dragon. Vikings River Splash is a Viking theme river rapids ride that was added in 2006 and has plenty of wet surprises. Riders' photos are taken at the end of the ride. Knight's Kingdom also has Granny's Apple Farms Restaurant, Knight's Barbecue Grill and Castle Burgers.

LEGO Movie World
It features the Masters of Flight and Unikitty's Disco Drop found in the California and Florida versions with its exclusive ride being a Technical Park Aerobat.

LEGOREDO Town
LEGOREDO Town is a Western-themed land that contains the rides Lego Canoe, LEGOLDMINE, Westernride' and ghost The hunted House. LEGOREDO also has its own band called "The Rattlesnakes" and they play country music all day long. The mountain terrain of Lego Canoe offers a scenic background.

Mini Land
Mini Land is the heart of any Legoland park. The 1:20 scale Lego brick models feature landscapes, sights and buildings from all over Denmark, as well as famous landmarks from other parts of the world. These include, in addition to the models listed below, the Acropolis of Athens and scenes from Star Wars. The LEGOTop observation tower offers a nice view of the entire park. The models and structures in Mini Land were made using more than 25 million Lego bricks.

Ninjago World
Ninjago World, which opened in 2016, features NINJAGO: The Ride, an interactive dark ride using gesture controls. The technology was developed by Triotech, who had previously developed the interactive Voyage to the Iron Reef dark ride at Knott's Berry Farm.

Pirate Land
Pirate Land is a pirate-themed area. It features the Pirate Splash Battle where participants get wet. Other rides include Pirate Wave Breaker and Pirate Boats.

Polar Land
Polar Land is a North Pole and South Pole theme area that opened in 2012. This themed area was partially created from part of the Lego City themed area and the Event Center. It features the Polar X-plorer roller coaster and Ice Pilots School.Ice Pilots School was previously named Power Builders'' and carried a Bionicle theme when it was part of the Lego City themed area.

Attractions

Roller coasters

Water rides

Other rides

Kiddie rides

Building experiences

Shows

Extras
These attractions and activities all require an extra charge in addition to regular admission fees.

Special events
The park hosts many special events throughout the season, including a Halloween celebration and firework shows.

Retired rides and attractions

Accident

On 29 April 2007, a 21-year-old female employee was killed by a roller coaster when she climbed over a security fence to retrieve a guest's wallet.

Gallery

See also

 Incidents at European amusement parks

References

External links

 www.legoland.dk/en/ — Legoland Billund English language site
 Video of Legoland Billund in 1968

Legoland
Amusement parks in Denmark
1968 establishments in Denmark
Tourist attractions in the Region of Southern Denmark
Buildings and structures in Billund Municipality
Amusement parks opened in 1968